Jagodne Małe  is a village in the administrative district of Gmina Miłki, within Giżycko County, Warmian-Masurian Voivodeship, in northern Poland.

References

Villages in Giżycko County